Sanguisorba canadensis, the white burnet<ref name = RHSPF>{{cite web | url = https://www.rhs.org.uk/Plants/16401/Sanguisorba-canadensis/Details | title = Sanguisorba canadensis | publisher = RHS | access-date = 28 August 2021}}</ref> or Canadian burnet, is a species of flowering plant in the Rose family Rosaceae, native to North America. This herbaceous perennial commonly grows in bogs, swamps, and roadsides from Labrador to Georgia.

Unlike its close relatives, Sanguisorba officinalis (great burnet) and Sanguisorba minor'' (salad burnet), the leaves must be cooked to be eaten, in order to remove the bitterness.

References

canadensis
Edible plants
Flora of North America
Plants described in 1753
Taxa named by Carl Linnaeus